Kevin John Dare (born 15 November 1959 in Finchley) is an English former professional footballer who played for Crystal Palace in the Football League as a left back. He began his youth career at Crystal Palace and signed professional terms in February 1977. He did not make his League debut until 1981 as Palace had a number of other options at full back including Kenny Sansom, Terry Fenwick and Paul Hinshelwood. In 1982 after only six appearances for Palace, Dare moved on, to non-league football with Enfield.

References

External links
Crystal Palace player stats at neilbrown.com
Dare at holmesdale.net

1959 births
Living people
Footballers from Finchley
English footballers
Association football defenders
Crystal Palace F.C. players
Enfield F.C. players
English Football League players